Robert Davidson (1804–1894) was a Scottish inventor who built the first known electric locomotive in 1837.
He was a lifelong resident of Aberdeen, northeast Scotland, where he was a prosperous chemist and dyer, amongst other ventures. Davidson was educated at Marischal College, where he studied second and third year classes from 1819-1821, including lectures from Professor Patrick Copland. He got this education in return for being a lab assistant.

In the 1820s, he set up in business close to the Aberdeen-Inverurie Canal, at first supplying yeast, before becoming involved in the manufacture and supply of chemicals.

He became interested in the new electrical technologies of the day. From 1837, he made small electric motors on his own principles.

Exhibitions
Davidson staged an exhibition of electrical machinery at Aberdeen, Scotland, and in  Edinburgh where it was viewed on February 12, 1842, by the young James Clerk Maxwell.

Later he exhibited at the Egyptian Hall in Piccadilly in London, where he hoped to attract sponsorship for his work. Among the machines shown were his locomotive, an electrically driven lathe and printing press, and an electromagnet capable of lifting 2 tons.

First electric railway locomotive
Davidson made a model electric locomotive in 1837. His Galvani of 1842 was a four-wheeled machine, powered by zinc-acid batteries. It was tested on the Edinburgh-Glasgow line in September 1842 and, although found capable of carrying itself at 4 mph, it did not haul any passengers or goods.
Davidson had trained as a chemist and made a successful business in the production of synthetic yeast for the baking and brewing industries. This gave him time to devote to his hobby of electromagnetism. He designed his own chemical batteries to provide power and, being a practical man, was enthusiastic about the potential of electromagnetism to drive machinery. By 1839 he had designed a printing press, a turning lathe and a four-wheeled car that all used Davidson's batteries and rudimentary electric motor. Davidson decided to demonstrate
his inventions to the public and arranged an exhibition of his work, first of all in Aberdeen and subsequently in Edinburgh. He converted his car to run on a circular
wooden track for the exhibition and even printed the handbills advertising the show on his electrically-driven printing press. Davidson had such faith in the opportunities that
electromagnetism offered that he had his eye on a bigger and more ambitious scheme.

He approached the directors of the Edinburgh and Glasgow Railway for their support in building an electromagnetic railway locomotive. Davidson aimed to show the new railway company that electric locomotives were a practical option. He obtained the endorsement of the Royal Scottish Society for Arts in his ventures and they made him a £15 grant. He built a full size locomotive, Galvani of 1842, which was a four-wheeled machine, 16 feet long and powered by Davidson's batteries. It was trialled on a section of the Edinburgh to Glasgow line in 1842 and was thus the world's first electrically powered railway locomotive. This was its only claim to fame as the locomotive only managed to achieve a speed of 4 mph and as the batteries were not rechargeable, it was hardly practical. The directors were not sufficiently impressed to asked Davidson to take the concept further. The locomotive was reported as being destroyed whilst stored in the engine house at Perth.

Davidson's legacy
He has been described as a forgotten hero and electrical visionary. He could not interest the rail companies; the technology he employed was too expensive.

In 1840, the Aberdeen Banner had predicted that the type of machinery he was producing "will in no distant date supplant steam"; however, it was only when electric locomotives were introduced in the 1890s that the media came to recognize what he had done. He was described as the "oldest living electrician" and The Electrician magazine reported " Robert Davidson was undoubtedly the first to demonstrate the possibility of electrical traction in a practical way".

A working model of his electrical motor can be seen at the Grampian Transport Museum.

Business
After 1843, at home in Aberdeen, he settled down to family life and, for the next fifty years, the running of his business at Canal Road. His earlier invention of a method for large-scale production of yeast, one of the staples of his chemical business, and the manufacture of perfumes were so remunerative that it allowed him to indulge his many interests of astronomy, collecting of fine china, valuable pictures and a large collection of violins.

See also
 Neale (electric car)

References

Further reading
 The Practical Mechanic Vol II, November 1842 pp 48–51.
 J.H.R. Body, "A Note on Electro-Magnetic Engines", Newcomen Society Transactions: 14: 103–107.
 Robert C. Post (1974) "Electro-Magnetism and Motive Power: Robert Davidson's "Galvani" of 1842", Railroad History, pages 5–23.
 A.C. Davidson (January 1976) "An Ingenious Aberdonian", The Scots Magazine
 John R. Stevens (editor) (1989,90) Pioneers of Electric Railroading: Their Story in Words and Pictures, Chapter 1, pages 1 – 6, published by The Electric Railroader's Association
 John Aspinall (1909) Presidential Address to the Institution of Mechanical Engineers (appendix) includes extract from Railway Times, 10 December 1842.

1804 births
1894 deaths
Scottish inventors
People from Aberdeen
Alumni of the University of Aberdeen
Scottish railway mechanical engineers
British railway pioneers
Sustainable transport pioneers
19th-century British businesspeople